Nursultan is a Kazakh male name. Nur sultan can be literally translated as "radiant sultan", "the sultan of sunlight" in the Kazakh language.

Nur-Sultan was the name of the capital of Kazakhstan from 2019 to 2022, the city is currently known as Astana. The name was given to the capital when it was named after Nursultan Nazarbayev.

Nursultan may refer to:
Nursultan Nazarbayev (born 1940), president of Kazakhstan from 1990 to 2019, who the capital city was named for from 2019 to 2022
Nursultan Belgibayev (born 1991), Kazakhstani ice hockey player
Nursultan Mamayev (born 1993), Kazakhstani taekwondo practitioner
Nursultan Bimurza (born 1994), Kazakhstani volleyball player

Kazakh given names